Cold sweat may refer to:

 Cold sweat or diaphoresis, excessive sweating commonly associated with shock and other medical emergency conditions

Film and TV
 Cold Sweat (1970 film), a film starring Charles Bronson
 Cold Sweat (1993 film), a thriller film
Cold Sweat, the 92nd episode of Code Lyoko

Music
 "Cold Sweat", a 1967 song by James Brown
 Cold Sweat (album), the 1967 album by James Brown
 "Cold Sweat" (Thin Lizzy song), a 1983 song by Thin Lizzy
 "Cold Sweat", a song from The Sugarcubes' debut album Life's Too Good
 "Cold Sweat", a song from Tinashe's 2014 album Aquarius

 "Cold Sweat", a song from Megadeth's 2013 album Super Collider